Fameflower is a common name for several flowering plants in different families in order Caryophyllales, and may refer to:

Phemeranthus, native to the Americas
Talinum